Ayuyagawa Dam  is a gravity dam located in Hyogo Prefecture in Japan. The dam is used for flood control and irrigation. The catchment area of the dam is 8.7 km2. The dam impounds about 12  ha of land when full and can store 1800 thousand cubic meters of water. The construction of the dam was completed in 1970.

See also
List of dams in Japan

References

Dams in Hyogo Prefecture